Dobri Dol (is a village in the municipality of Vrapčište, North Macedonia. It used to be part of Negotino-Pološko Municipality.

History
According to the 1467-68 Ottoman defter, Dobri Dol appears as being largely inhabited by an Orthodox Christian Albanian population. Due to Slavicisation, some families had a mixed Slav-Albanian anthroponomy - usually a Slavic first name and an Albanian last name or last names with Albanian patronyms and Slavic suffixes. 

The names are: Gjin, son of Beka-jo; Miho, his brother; Tan-o, his brother; Gjin, his other son; Gjon, son of Leko; Nik-o, son of Leko; Gjon, son of Stojan; Bogdan, son of Stojan; Dan-ço, son of Krum (Krymi); Petko, son of Gjin; Mill, son of Petko; Tano, the son of Miho; Petko, son of Gjon; Dimitri, son of Kale; Daba, son of Kola; Dança, son of Gjergj; Nikola, son of Pop; Jak-o, his son; Gjin, son of Pop.

Demographics
As of the 2021 census, Dobri Dol had 3,546 residents with the following ethnic composition:
Albanians 3,401
Persons for whom data are taken from administrative sources 137
Others 6
Macedonians 2

According to the 2002 census, the village had a total of 5,223 inhabitants. Ethnic groups in the village include:
Albanians 5,206
Macedonians 2
Turks 1 
Others 14

Sports
The local football club KF Besa Dobërdoll plays in the Macedonian Second League.

References

External links

Villages in Vrapčište Municipality
Albanian communities in North Macedonia